Guanabara Esporte Clube, usually known simply as Guanabara, is a Brazilian football team from the city of Araruama, Rio de Janeiro state. The club was founded on May 25, 2004.

Stadium
Guanabara's home stadium is Estádio Mário Castanho, usually known as Arena Guanabara, inaugurated in 2006. Its maximum capacity is 10,000 people.

Colors
The club's official colors are blue, yellow and white.

References

External links
Official website

Association football clubs established in 2004
Football clubs in Rio de Janeiro (state)
2004 establishments in Brazil